91kt.com is a joint venture between Turner Broadcasting System Asia Pacific and Netdragon. The site serves as an official website of Cartoon Network in China. It has Flash games and bulletin boards, and has television series available as a video on demand service.

In the People's Republic of China, Cartoon Network has a dedicated TV channel, and also its original series are broadcast on terrestrial TV channels, notably, The Powerpuff Girls broadcast on China Central Television.

List of Cartoon Network programming on China TV stations

List of Cartoon Network shows on China video platforms 

Former: Courage the Cowardly Dog (Tencent Video), Dexter Laboratory (Youku/Le.com), Codename: Kids Next Door, The Grim Adventures of Billy and Mandy (Le.com)

Coming Soon: Apple and Onion (苹果与洋葱)

Notes: Some programs available with Simplified Chinese subtitles such as We Bare Bears, Unikitty!, Summer Camp Island, etc.

References

External links 

 

Cartoon Network